Together for Democracy and Sovereignty (EDS) is an Ivorian political party.

Election results

2017 establishments in Ivory Coast
Political parties established in 2017
Political parties in Ivory Coast